Roger de Carvalho (born 10 December 1986), known as Roger Carvalho, is a Brazilian footballer who plays as a central defender for Tombense.

Biography
Carvalho was signed by Iraty in January 2007. He signed a two-year contract with Iraty in November 2006 and was loaned to Rio Branco for 2007 Paraná state football championship. He then transferred to Tombense, a proxy club for the investees where he was immediately loaned to Portuguese Second Division club Olivais e Moscavide. In January 2009, he returned to Brazil for Guarani (MG). The team finished as the least in 2009 Minas Gerais state championship.

Figueirense
Carvalho came to Figueirense in May 2009, and helped the team get promoted to the first division the following year, as 2010 runner-up. Roger played 27 games in 2011 first division, starting 20 times. With Tombense, he also signed a new three-year contract effective on 1 January 2010. He was loaned to Figueirense in January 2010, May 2010, and again in January 2011.

Genoa
On 31 January 2012, Carvalho was loaned to Italian Serie A club Genoa C.F.C. He took the number #3 shirt from departed Dario Dainelli. Roger is a dual Brazil-European Union citizen, thus he was not restricted by the non-EU policy of the FIGC. He made his debut on 15 February 2012 after Kakha Kaladze was suspended.

São Paulo
On 21 August 2013, Carvalho was loaned to São Paulo FC until the 2014 Campeonato Paulista Finals. Tricolor paid a contract fee of €3 million for the defender. However, his opportunities to play at São Paulo were diminished by two factors: the possible return of Rafael Toloi (on loan to AS Roma), and the awaited arrival of Breno Borges (signed pending adjudication of a court sentence in Germany).

Vitória
Roger Carvalho joined Vitória on 29 July 2014. The defender stayed at the club until the end of the year.

Botafogo
On 3 January 2015, Roger Carvalho was signed by Botafogo.

Honours
Botafogo
Campeonato Brasileiro Série B: 2015

Palmeiras
Campeonato Brasileiro Série A: 2016

References

External links
 UOL Esporte 
 

Brazilian footballers
Brazilian expatriate footballers
Iraty Sport Club players
Rio Branco Sport Club players
Tombense Futebol Clube players
C.D. Olivais e Moscavide players
Figueirense FC players
Genoa C.F.C. players
Bologna F.C. 1909 players
São Paulo FC players
Esporte Clube Vitória players
Botafogo de Futebol e Regatas players
Sociedade Esportiva Palmeiras players
Atlético Clube Goianiense players
Campeonato Brasileiro Série A players
Campeonato Brasileiro Série B players
Serie A players
Association football central defenders
Expatriate footballers in Portugal
Expatriate footballers in Italy
Brazilian expatriate sportspeople in Portugal
Brazilian expatriate sportspeople in Italy
People from Arapongas
1986 births
Living people
Sportspeople from Paraná (state)